Herrestads AIF is a Swedish football club located in Uddevalla

External links
Official site 

Football clubs in Västra Götaland County
Association football clubs established in 1935
Bandy clubs established in 1935
1935 establishments in Sweden